The 2008–09 season saw Dundee compete in the Scottish First Division after coming 2nd place the season prior. Dundee finished in 4th position with 50 points.

Final league table

Results 
Dundee's score comes first

Legend

Scottish First Division

Scottish Cup

Scottish League Cup

Scottish Challenge Cup

References

External links 

 Dundee 2008–09 at Soccerbase.com (select relevant season from dropdown list)

Dundee F.C. seasons
Dundee